General elections were held in Greenland on 12 March 2013. The opposition Siumut party emerged as the largest in Parliament, winning 14 of the 31 seats. On 26 March Siumut leader Aleqa Hammond became Greenland's first female Prime Minister.

Electoral system
The 31 members of Parliament were elected by proportional representation in multi-member constituencies. In Nuuk there was just one polling station.

Campaign
The main campaign issue was exploitation of the island's mineral wealth. The ruling Inuit Ataqatigiit party supported allowing foreign workers, most of whom would be Chinese, into the country to work in the mining industry, whilst the Siumut party was opposed to the proposal.  Rare-earth elements were of particular concern.

Results

Government formation
Following the election results, Siumut leader Aleqa Hammond claimed that she was "in no hurry to form a coalition" and would wait to hear the demands of the other parties. Hammond ultimately formed a government with Atassut and the Inuit Party. Siumut took six of the eight cabinet posts, with Solidarity taking the Health and Infrastructure portfolio and the Inuit Party taking the Environment portfolio.

References

2013 elections in North America
2013 parliamentary
2013 in Greenland
March 2013 events in North America